David Charles Richardson (April 8, 1914 – June 13, 2015) was a vice admiral in the United States Navy. He was a former commander of the United States Sixth Fleet (from August 1968 – August 1972). He was a 1936 graduate of the United States Naval Academy. Richardson died in 2015 at the age of 101.

References

United States Navy admirals
United States Naval Academy alumni
1914 births
2015 deaths
American centenarians
Men centenarians